Bava Chelladurai is an Indian Tamil writer, storyteller, and actor.

Career

Storytelling career 
He began reciting books aloud in Tiruvannamalai with 60 people in attendance. The event grew to have 500 people listening to his storytelling. His son, Vamsi, uploaded videos of him telling stories on YouTube and was well received. Chelladurai helped organize an essay contest that took place in Coimbatore and its surrounding districts.

Acting career 
He played a comical character in Joker (2016). Chelladurai played supporting roles in Kudimagan (2019) and Psycho (2020) before playing a major role in Walter (2020) as a health minister. He acted as Krishnan in Jai Bhim (2021), an Indian Tamil legal film.

Social activism 
He is also an activist and is part of a jury that is against the murders of Dalits. Chelladurai also spoke up against the construction of a drainage pipe in Sonagiri Forest in Tiruvannamalai.

Books 
Chelladurai has written several Tamil books including:

Ella Nalum Karthigai
From 19 DM Saron
Bashirin Arai Aththanai Elithil Thirakkapadavillai
Dominick
Siragisaitha Kaalam (co-written by V Nedu Cheziyan) 
Ruins of the Night (co-written by Janaki Venataraman)
Natchaththirangal olinthu kollum karuvarai

Filmography

References

External links 

Indian writers
Indian storytellers
Indian activists
Male actors in Tamil cinema
Living people
Year of birth missing (living people)